During the 1983–84 English football season, Everton F.C. competed in the Football League First Division and finished seventh in the table, runners-up in the League Cup and won the FA Cup for the first time in eighteen years.

Final league table

First Division

FA Cup

Final

League Cup

Final

Replay

References
evertonresults.com – Everton's Record in 1983-84

Everton
Everton